Nicolai may refer to:

Nicolai (given name) people with the forename Nicolai
Nicolai (surname) people with the surname Nicolai
Nicolai (crater), a crater on the Moon

See also

 Niccolai, a surname
 Nicolae (disambiguation)
 Nicolao
 Nicolay (disambiguation)
 Nikolai (disambiguation)
 Nikolay (disambiguation)